Haaland v. Brackeen is a pending Supreme Court of the United States case brought by the states of Texas, Louisiana, and Indiana, and individual plaintiffs, that seeks to declare the Indian Child Welfare Act (ICWA) unconstitutional. In addition to Haaland v. Brackeen (docket no. 21-376), three additional cases have been consolidated to be heard at the same time. Those cases are Cherokee Nation v. Brackeen, Texas v. Haaland, and Brackeen v. Haaland. 

The matter originally came up in a Texas District Court on an adoption petition filed by Chad and Jennifer Brackeen. After their effort was challenged by the Navajo Tribe, the Brackeens brought suit in the U.S. District Court in Fort Worth. The Cherokee Nation, Oneida Nation, Quinault Indian Nation, and Morongo Band of Mission Indians intervened in the case. The U.S. District Court declared that the ICWA was unconstitutional and the case was appealed.

The Fifth Circuit Court of Appeals reversed the District Court in a panel opinion. The full court, on rehearing the case en banc, held that parts of the law, that set federal standards for lower and state courts, were constitutional, but that the parts of the law that required state agencies to perform certain acts were unconstitutional as a violation of the Tenth Amendment.

The Supreme Court heard the case on November 9, 2022, and a decision is expected in spring 2023.

Background

Indian Child Welfare Act

In 1978, the Congress enacted a law to protect American Indian children from removal from their tribes to be adopted by non-Indians. As many as 35 percent of Indian children were being removed from their homes, mainly from intact families, and being placed in non-Indian homes. This was often not in the best interest of the child, but for racial reasons, with "programs that took Native American children from their homes and placed them into boarding schools as part of a targeted process of assimilation." 

Congress established the following order of priorities for placing an Indian child who had to be removed from a home. First, the child should be placed with a member of the child's extended family, other members of the child's tribe, or other Indian families. Second, the child could be placed in a foster home approved by the child's tribe, or third, in a foster home approved by the state or other non-Indian authority. Finally, they could be placed in an institution operated or approved by an Indian tribe.

Brackeen adoption attempt
In June 2016, a 10-month-old Navajo boy was placed with Chad and Jennifer Brackeen, a former civil engineer and an anesthesiologist, respectively, after his Navajo mother (who lived in Texas) was found to be using drugs. The father of the child is Cherokee. In 2017 a Texas state court terminated the parental rights of both the biological parents. Under the provisions of the ICWA, the Navajo Nation stepped in and sought to place the child with a Navajo family, but that failed and the Brackeens were allowed to adopt the child. The Brackeens later attempted to adopt the boy's sister in state court, but the girl's extended family also sought to take in the girl. The Brackeens then filed suit in federal court to overturn the ICWA on the grounds of racial discrimination. This approach would "completely erase [...] tribal sovereignty" according to Lauren van Schilfgaarde, a tribal sovereignty advocate.

State trial court
The adoption petition for the sister by the Brackeens was heard in state District Court by Judge Alex Kim, who stated that ICWA violated the Texas Constitution. In state court, the Brackeens argued that they had more money than the child's Navajo relations, and would therefore be better for the child. Following the presentation of evidence, the state's attorney stated that according to state guidelines, the child should be placed with her Navajo family. Judge Kim disagreed and placed the child with the Brackeen family, but allowed limited visitation with her Navajo family. Both sides were unhappy with portions of the decision and appealed, settlement was subsequently reached and the state appeal was dismissed.

U.S. District Court 

The Brackeens' federal lawsuit was filed in the federal District Court in Fort Worth in October 2017, and assigned to Judge Reed O'Connor. The Cherokee Nation, Oneida Nation, Quinault Indian Nation, and Morongo Band of Mission Indians intervened in the case.

Plaintiffs 
The states of Texas, Louisiana, and Indiana were the state plaintiffs, while the non-Indians Brackeens, Librettis, Cliffords, and Ms. Hernandez were individual plaintiffs. The Librettis (Nick and Heather) had sought to adopt a Tigua Pueblo child, with the approval of the child's mother, Altagracia Hernandez. The Tigua Pueblo tribe intervened in the Nevada state court proceedings, but agreed not to contest the adoption in late 2018. The Cliffords (Jason and Danielle) had attempted to adopt a child whose grandmother was a member of the White Earth Band of the Ojibwe Tribe in Minnesota. In the Clifford case, the child was placed with the maternal grandmother in accordance with ICWA by the Minnesota court that heard their case.

Defendants 
The federal defendants included the Department of the Interior and Secretary Ryan Zinke, the Bureau of Indian Affairs and Director Bryan C. Rice, and the Department of Health and Human Services and Secretary Alex Azar.

Summary judgment 
In 2018, Judge O'Connor issued an order finding that:

It was the first time a constitutional challenge to the ICWA had been successful.

Court of Appeals

Procedural background 
After the District Court found that the ICWA and the applicable federal regulations "violated equal protection, the Tenth Amendment, and the nondelegation doctrine", all sides appealed the case to the United States Court of Appeals for the Fifth Circuit. The case was assigned to a panel consisting of Senior Judge Jacques L. Wiener Jr., Judge James L. Dennis, and Chief Judge Priscilla Owen and argued on March 13, 2019.

Panel opinion 
Judge Dennis delivered the opinion of the Court on August 9, 2019, which was modified on August 16, 2019. The opinion reversed the decision of the District Court, and rendered judgment for the federal government and the Indian tribes. Dennis ruled that although the Brackeens and other plaintiffs had standing to sue, the District Court erred by considering this to be a race-based law. Instead, it was a law based on political considerations, citing a United States Supreme Court case, United States v. Antelope which had held "that federal legislation with respect to Indian tribes ... is not based upon impermissible racial classifications.

The panel also looked at whether ICWA required that state courts and state officials were "commandeered" to enforce federal law and concluded, two to one, that it had not. This was based on the Supremacy Clause, and the panel concluded that ICWA did not commandeer the agencies, but merely regulated the adoption and placement of Indian children. Chief Judge Owen dissented from this part of the opinion.

En banc opinion 
On November 7, 2019, the Fifth Circuit, at the request of one of the judges, ordered that the case be heard en banc. Once ordered, 486 Indian tribes, 59 American Indian organizations, and 26 states filed amicus briefs in support of the constitutionality of the ICWA. On January 22, 2020, the Court heard oral arguments. On April 6, 2021, the court issued a per curiam opinion that summarized the primary opinions of Judge Dennis or Judge Kyle Duncan. The court unanimously ruled that at least one party had standing to bring the suit, and a majority held that Congress had the authority to enact the ICWA.

The per curiam opinion also held that the "Indian child" classification did not violate equal protection. It did however, in a non-precedental holding, determine that the adoptive placement and preference for an "Indian foster home" did violate equal protection. The court held "that ICWA's "active efforts," § 1912(d), expert witness, § 1912(e) and (f), and recordkeeping requirements, § 1915(e), unconstitutionally commandeer state actors", violating the Tenth Amendment, and affirming the District Court. However, it also held "that the following provisions validly preempt contrary state law to the extent they apply to state courts (as opposed to state agencies): the placement preferences, § 1915(a) and (b), and the placement and termination standards, § 1912(e) and (f)", reversing the lower court.

The published opinions by Dennis and Duncan, together with the concurrences and dissents by other judges were over 200 pages.

Supreme Court

Petition for writ of certiorari
Following the en banc decision of the Fifth Circuit Court, the United States, the State of Texas, the Cherokee Nation, and the Brackeens all petitioned the Supreme Court for a writ of certiorari. On February 28, 2022, the Court granted all four petitions. The Supreme Court consolidated the other three cases into Deb Haaland, Secretary of the Interior, et al. v. Chad Everet Brackeen, et al., allotting one hour for oral argument. All four cases dealt with the same basic subject matter, but from the perspective of each individual appellant, and it is a more efficient use of the Court's time to hear them at the same time.

Oral argument 
The case was argued on November 9, 2022. The Court had originally planned on one hour of oral argument, but argument took over three hours.

The argument of the adoptive parents

The Brackeens and the other two non-Native American couples were represented pro bono by Matthew McGill of Gibson Dunn. The first argument presented was that ICWA did away with the "best interest of the child" test used by most states. 
McGill argued that ICWA violated the equal protection clause by treating Native American children differently, and argued that Congress did not have the authority under the Constitution to regulate Native Americans throughout the United States. McGill argued that the plenary power doctrine in American Indian case law was not based nor authorized under the Indian Commerce Clause of the Constitution. On questioning by Justice Amy Coney Barrett, McGill stated that Congress's "plenary power applies to the tribe's areas of its sovereign interests, tribal lands, treaty powers, its internal affairs, its ability to self-govern." Justice Sonia Sotomayor immediately questioned that position, pointing out a list of laws governing Indians since the late 1700s.

The argument of the federal government
The United States, represented by Deputy Solicitor General Edwin Kneedler argued that the Congress did have the right to regulate the tribes, so long as the law was "rationally related" to the governments obligations to the tribes.

The argument of the States
The position of the States was presented by Texas Solicitor General Judd E. Stone. Stone argued that ICWA violated the Tenth Amendment anti-commandeering provisions.

The argument of the tribes
Ian H. Gershengorn argued the position of the American Indian tribes to the Court.

Subsequent developments
Following the lower court decisions, New Mexico passed a law to codify various provisions of the ICWA into state law.

Footnotes

References

Child welfare in the United States
Indigenous law
United States Court of Appeals for the Fifth Circuit cases
2021 in United States case law
United States nondelegation doctrine case law
United States Supreme Court cases
United States Supreme Court cases of the Roberts Court